The Vilyuy Dam is a large dam and hydroelectric power station on the Vilyuy River in Chernyshevsky, Sakha Republic, Russia. The dam was built between 1964 and 1967 to provide power for diamond mines in the area. It is located in the southern part of the Vilyuy Plateau and was one of the first of such major structures in the world to be built on permafrost. Vilyuy is reported to have the coldest operating conditions of any hydroelectric plant in the world.

Its power station has four turbines with a combined capacity of 650 MW, generating 2,710 million KWh annually. Behind the dam, the Vilyuy Reservoir started filling in 1969 and topped out in 1973.

The filling of the reservoir also displaced about 600 people.

See also
Chona

References

External links

Dams in Russia
Buildings and structures in the Sakha Republic
Hydroelectric power stations built in the Soviet Union
Hydroelectric power stations in Russia
Dams completed in 1967